A leadership election for the Civic Democratic Party (ODS) was held in the Czech Republic on 5 December 1999. Václav Klaus was confirmed as the party's leader. With strong support from regions, he was the only candidate. Ivan Langer and Dagmar Lastovecká were offered the chance to stand but they declined.

Results

References

1999
1999 elections in the Czech Republic
Single-candidate elections
Civic Democratic Party leadership election